Like Love, Lust and the Open Halls of the Soul is the third album by Seattle band Jesse Sykes and the Sweet Hereafter. It was released in 2007 on Barsuk Records.

Sykes said the structure of the album's songs were often not what listeners initially expected. "Essentially, what we're doing is kind of folk music, but the structures are complex," she said. "It's like country/folk/rock with a psychedelic bent."

She said the album's elaborate title was inspired by a heavily tattooed bar patron Sykes saw outside a club in Reno: "I met this extraordinary guy. He was covered in tattoos, and he had three scripted L's tattooed on his wrist," she recalled. "When I asked him what it meant, he said, 'Like, Love, Lust, baby'—and he pointed at his wife and said, 'That's all that matters. You got that, and you got everything'." Sykes said "Aftermath" drew its inspiration from Swedish singer-songwriter Nicolai Dunger, who provides backup vocals on another song, "Station Grey". "It was magical," she said. "He was just sitting on my couch and playing a bunch of his songs, some of my favorites. He has kind of a strange, complicated style. I was so inspired, and I think 'Aftermath' came out of trying to incorporate that experience."

Four of the album's songs were co-written with Sweet Hereafter guitarist Phil Wandscher, formerly of Whiskeytown. Sykes said: "Phil's playing kind of blows me away, and in my writing process, now, it turns out that the songs have a lot more space for him to do things, important things. They're not guitar solos for the sake of guitar solos. They're actually complex melodic structures that are almost classical at times. There are a lot of counterpoints and layering in the records. Nothing unnecessary; everything seems to be reacting to something else."

The album was initially recorded with longtime producer Tucker Martine, but remixed by English-born, Seattle-based producer Martin Feveyear after concerns over the sound.

Track listing
(all words and music by Jesse Sykes except where noted)

 "Eisenhower Moon" – 3:33
 "LLL" – 3:57
 "You Might Walk Away" – 2:49
 "Air Is Thin" (Jesse Sykes, Phil Wandscher) – 4:20
 "Spectral Beings" – 4:13
 "How Will We Know" (Sykes, Wandscher) – 5:24
 "Hard Not to Believe" – 4:36
 "Aftermath" – 3:27
 "Station Grey" – 5:04
 "I Like The Sound" (Sykes, Wandscher) – 3:51
 "Morning It Comes" (Sykes, Wandscher) – 6:08
 "Open Halls of the Soul" – 5:26

Personnel

 Jesse Sykes – vocals, acoustic guitar
 Phil Wandscher – guitars, harmonica, lapsteel, keyboards, vocals
 Anne Marie Ruljancich – viola, vocals
 Bill Herzog – electric and upright bass, vocals
 Eric Eagle – drums, percussion

Additional musicians:

 Micah Hulscher – piano, harmonium
 Steve Moore – keyboards, organ
 Eyvind Kang – viola, violin
 Wayne Horvitz – Hammond B3
 Gretchen Yanover – cello
 Dave Carter – trumpet
 Craig Flory – saxophone
 Josiah Boothby – french horn
 Ben O'Shea – trombone
 Billy Joe Huel – trumpet
 Ron Weinstein – Hammond B3
 Tucker Martine – percussion
 Nicolai Dunger – backup vocals ("Air is Thin", "Station Grey")

References

2007 albums
Southern Lord Records albums
Albums produced by Martin Feveyear
Jesse Sykes albums